Bahama Breeze is an American restaurant chain owned by Darden Restaurants. They specialize in Caribbean-inspired seafood, chicken, steaks, and tropical drinks.

History
Founded in 1996 by Darden Restaurants, Inc., their first location was in Orlando, Florida on International Drive.

As of April 2014, there are 37 Bahama Breeze locations in the United States. Most locations are in suburban retail districts and tourist areas.

References

External links
 Official website

Companies based in Orlando, Florida
Restaurants established in 1996
Darden Restaurants brands
Restaurant chains in the United States
1996 establishments in Florida